Qabatiya (also spelled Qabatia, Qabatya, and Kabatiya) is a Palestinian city located in the Jenin Governorate of the State of Palestine, in the northern West Bank, located 6 km south of Jenin. According to the Palestinian Central Bureau of Statistics (PCBS) census, the town had a population of 19,197 in 2007.

Its entire land area is 50,547 dunams (50.5 km2; 19.5 sq mi), and its elevation is roughly 256 meters (840 feet). Qabatiya is famous for its olive groves, modern agriculture, and limestone industry.

History
Sherds have been found here from Persian, Hellenistic, early and late Roman, Byzantine, early Muslim and Medieval eras. A Muslim traveller in the 12th century CE indicated it as "a village in the district of Jenin".

Ottoman era
Qabatiya, like all of Palestine was incorporated into the Ottoman Empire in 1517.  In the 1596  tax registers, it was part of the nahiya ("subdistrict") of Jabal Sami, part of the larger Sanjak of Nablus. It had a population of 89 households and 18 bachelors, all Muslims. The inhabitants paid a fixed tax rate of 33.3% on agricultural products, including wheat, barley, summer crops, olive trees, goats and beehives, in addition to occasional revenues; a total of 14,920 akçe. Half of the revenues went to the Tarabay Bey of Lajjun. In 1105 AH (1693 CE) Abd al-Ghani al-Nabulsi mentioned a village on the road from Nablus to Jenin.

in 1838 Edward Robinson found it to be a very large village, surrounded by very extensive and beautiful olive groves, while in 1850, it was described as surrounded by gardens, built on the side of a wooden hill, covered with olive trees.

In 1870 Victor Guérin found gardens around Koubatieh planted with fig, olive and pomegranate trees, with vegetables underneath. It was  a large village, divided into several areas under the jurisdiction of many different sheikhs. He further  noted that “Kubataieh stands upon a rocky hill, whose sides are pierced by numerous cisterns of ancient origin, some of which are partly filled up and in bad repair ; others are still used by the people. The latter are closed at the mouth by great round stones in form of a mill-stone, pierced in the centre. This second opening is itself closed by another stone, which is taken away when the water is drawn. This system of closed wells and cisterns by means of a stone is of extreme antiquity. It is found in many parts of Palestine, and was in use before the Hebrew conquest.”

In 1882, the PEF's Survey of Western Palestine described it as a “large stone village on a slope, east of a small plain which is full of olives. It has a sacred place on the south (Sheikh Theljy), and a good orange garden near the village.”

British Mandate era
In the 1922 census of Palestine, conducted by the British Mandate authorities, Qabatiya had 1,803 inhabitants; 1,799 Muslims and 4 Christians, where the Christians were all Orthodox. This increased to 2,447 in the 1931 census; 2 Christians and the rest Muslims, in a total of 551 houses.

In the 1945 statistics the population of Qabatiya, together with Kh. Tannin, was 3,670, all Muslims, with 50,547 dunams of land, according to an official land and population survey. 9,542 dunams were used for plantations and irrigable land, 21,464  dunams for cereals, while 113 dunams were built-up (urban) land and 19,428 sunams were classified as "non-cultivable".

Jordanian era
In the wake of the 1948 Arab–Israeli War, and after the 1949 Armistice Agreements, the Jenin-area came under Jordanian rule, together with the rest of the West Bank.

In 1961, the population of Qabatiya was 5,917.

Post-1967
Since the Six-Day War in 1967, Qabatiya has been under Israeli occupation.

After Oslo II in 1995, Qabatiya came under Palestinian Authority (PA) administration, in what is now known as Areas A and B.

Approximately ten Palestinians were killed between October 2015 and July 2016 while carrying out attacks against Israelis. In July 2016, clashes between Palestinians and Israeli armed forces occurred during a house demolition by Israel of a man accused of being involved in an attack in Jerusalem. The Israeli military reported that the military convoy that carried out the demolition was met by Molotov cocktails and fire from improvised guns. Palestinian officials reported six Palestinians wounded in the exchange, with the Israeli military confirming three Palestinians hit. Israel calls the demolition of homes of attackers as a deterrent to violence, while human rights groups and Palestinians condemn it as a form of collective punishment.

References

Bibliography

  
  

 
  
 

  
  (Monro, 1835, vol 1,   p. 277, cited in Robinson and Smith, vol 3, p. 154)

External links
    Welcome To Qabatiya 
Qabatiya, Welcome to Palestine
Survey of Western Palestine, Map 11: IAA, Wikimedia commons 
Google-map
Wolfram|Alpha – Qabatiya
Population statistics

Cities in the West Bank
Jenin Governorate
Municipalities of the State of Palestine